

Arts
Knife Edge, Knife-edge, or Knife's Edge may refer to:
 Knife Edge (film), a 2009 British thriller about gaslighting
 "Knife-Edge" (Emerson, Lake & Palmer song)
 Knife Edge: Nose Gunner, a video game
 Young Sherlock Holmes: Knife Edge, a 2003 book in the Young Sherlock Holmes book series
 Standing Figure: Knife Edge, a bronze sculpture by Henry Moore
 Knife Edge Two Piece 1962–65, an abstract bronze sculpture by Henry Moore
 Knife Edge, a 2004 novel in the Noughts & Crosses novel series
 "Knife Edge", a song by The Alarm from Strength

Places
 Knife's Edge, a bridge in the Zambezi River near Victoria Falls in Zambia
 Knife Edge, a hiking trail on Mount Katahdin, ME, US

Others
 Knife-edge effect, a redirecting of radiation from striking an obstacle
 Knife-edge flight, a radio controlled aerobatic maneuver 
 Knife-edge scanning microscope
 On a Knife Edge (documentary), a 2017 film about Native Americans
 Knife-edge measurement in statistics

See also